Andrew Scott Dickens (born August 4, 1984) is a former competitive swimmer from Canada, who mostly competes in the breaststroke events.  He claimed two medals at the 2007 Pan American Games in Rio de Janeiro, Brazil.  Dickens won his first national title at the 2004 Canadian Olympic Trials, earning his first trip to the Olympic Games where he finished 19th in the 100-metre breaststroke.

Dickens finished 8th in the semifinal heat and 16th overall in the 100-metre breaststroke at the 2012 Summer Olympics in London. Dickens was feeling sick during his semifinal race, with a running nose the morning of the race.  He also finished in 16th in the 200-metre breaststroke, and was part of the Canadian team that finishing in 8th place in the men's 4 x 100 medley relay.

On October 23, 2013, Dickens announced he was retiring from swimming after ten years with the national team.

References

External links
Profile Canadian Olympic Committee
Dickens Retirement

1984 births
Living people
Canadian male breaststroke swimmers
Commonwealth Games competitors for Canada
Olympic swimmers of Canada
Sportspeople from Burlington, Ontario
Swimmers at the 2003 Pan American Games
Swimmers at the 2004 Summer Olympics
Swimmers at the 2006 Commonwealth Games
Swimmers at the 2007 Pan American Games
Swimmers at the 2012 Summer Olympics
Swimmers from Ontario
UBC Thunderbirds swimmers
Pan American Games gold medalists for Canada
Pan American Games bronze medalists for Canada
Pan American Games medalists in swimming
Universiade medalists in swimming
Universiade silver medalists for Canada
Medalists at the 2005 Summer Universiade
Medalists at the 2007 Summer Universiade
Medalists at the 2003 Pan American Games
Medalists at the 2007 Pan American Games
21st-century Canadian people